Mary Jonas (20 February 1915 – 31 March 1990) was a Welsh film actress.

Jones was born in Rhayader, Radnorshire. She appeared in films like  Hay Fever (1946),  Celestial Fire (1928), The Big Chance (1957), The Promise (1969) and Under Milk Wood (1972).

Filmagraphy

References

External links

Welsh film actresses
1896 births
1990 deaths